Trevor Trevisan (born 21 December 1983) is an Italian football official and a former defender. He works as a club manager at Padova.

Career
Trevisan started his senior career at Sacilese and Pordenone at Serie D. After a season he was signed by L'Aquila at Serie C1. After the team almost relegated to Serie C2, he was signed by league rival Giulianova. He started to play regularly at 2004–05 season for Giulianova.

In July 2005 he was signed by Vicenza of Serie B. After nil appearances at 2007–08 season, he joined Pisa in a co-ownership deal on 15 January 2007. He won Serie B promotion with the team and was the regular of the team, and was signed by Pisa permanently.

In January 2009, after Pisa signed new defender likes Leonardo Bonucci, Trevisan was dropped to bench. He played 4 out of 5 matches in May towards to end of season.

After the bankruptcy of Pisa, he joined Padova which newly promoted to Serie B. He signed a 2+1 year contract.

On 31 January 2014, Trevisan joined Serie B side Varese on a loan deal.

At the end of the 2018–19 season, he retired as a player and was appointed to club manager position with Padova.

References

External links
 La Gazzetta dello Sport profile 
 Profile at Football.it 
 

1983 births
Living people
People from Cassino
Italian footballers
Association football defenders
L'Aquila Calcio 1927 players
Giulianova Calcio players
L.R. Vicenza players
Pisa S.C. players
Calcio Padova players
S.S.D. Varese Calcio players
U.S. Salernitana 1919 players
A.C. Reggiana 1919 players
Serie B players
Serie C players
Footballers from Lazio
Sportspeople from the Province of Frosinone